The Roman Catholic Diocese of El Alto is a diocese located in the city of El Alto in the Ecclesiastical province of La Paz in Bolivia.

History
 25 June 1994: Established as Diocese of El Alto from the Metropolitan Archdiocese of La Paz

Bishops

The list of Bishops of El Alto (Roman rite) and their years of service:
 Bishop Jesús Juárez Párraga, S.D.B. (1994–2013) appointed, Archbishop of Sucre
 Bishop Eugenio Scarpellini (2013–2020)
 Bishop Giovani Edgar Arana (2021–present)

Auxiliary bishops
Fernando Bascopé Müller, S.D.B. (2010-2014), appointed Bishop of Bolivia, Military
Eugenio Scarpellini (2010-2013), appointed Bishop here
Giovani Edgar Arana (2018-2021), appointed Bishop here
Pascual Limachi Ortiz (2019-2021), appointed Prelate of Corocoro

See also
Roman Catholicism in Bolivia

References

External links
 GCatholic.org

Roman Catholic dioceses in Bolivia
Christian organizations established in 1994
Roman Catholic dioceses and prelatures established in the 20th century
El Alto, Roman Catholic Diocese of
1994 establishments in Bolivia